George Sweeny (February 22, 1796 – October 10, 1877) was a U.S. Representative from Ohio.

Born near Gettysburg, Pennsylvania, Sweeny was a graduate of Dickinson College, Carlisle, Pennsylvania.
A lawyer, he was admitted to the bar and commenced practice in Gettysburg in 1820, moving to Bucyrus, Ohio, in 1830. He served as prosecuting attorney of Crawford County in 1838.

Sweeny was elected as a Democrat to the Twenty-sixth and Twenty-seventh Congresses (March 4, 1839 – March 3, 1843). He was not a candidate for renomination in 1842, and returned to the practice of law in Ohio, including another term as prosecutor in Crawford County.

He died in Bucyrus, Ohio, October 10, 1877.

Sources

External links

 

1796 births
1877 deaths
People from Gettysburg, Pennsylvania
People from Bucyrus, Ohio
Dickinson College alumni
County district attorneys in Ohio
Ohio lawyers
19th-century American politicians
19th-century American lawyers
Democratic Party members of the United States House of Representatives from Ohio